Raymond John Deakin (19 June 1959 – 24 December 2008) was an English footballer, whose playing position was left-back. He had a 14-year career in the Football League with Everton, Port Vale, Bolton Wanderers, and Burnley. He captained Burnley at Wembley in the 1988 Football League Trophy Final.

Career
Born in Liverpool, Deakin began his career at Everton, where he signed his first professional contract under Gordon Lee in 1977. However, he never made any appearances for the "Toffees" first team, and was released from Goodison Park in 1981. He then joined John McGrath's Port Vale, where he spent one season. He was initially a regular in the "Valiants" team, but lost his place in October 1981 and struggled to break back into first-team contention thereafter. He claimed seven goals (including five penalties) in 27 Fourth Division and FA Cup appearances, having scored his first goal in the Football League on 5 September 1981, in a 1–1 draw with Darlington at Feethams.

Deakin left Vale Park and joined Bolton Wanderers on a free transfer in May 1982. John McGovern's "Trotters" were relegated out of the Second Division in last place in 1982–83, though only three more points would have seen Bolton escape the drop at the expense of Grimsby Town. Wanderers finished tenth in the Third Division in 1983–84, before dropping to 17th place in 1984–85. He scored two goals in 105 league games during his three-season stay at Burnden Park.

Deakin signed for Martin Buchan's Burnley in 1985. He scored three goals in 52 games in 1985–86 and again played all 52 games in the 1986–87 campaign, as he remained in the starting eleven as the "Clarets" switched manager from Buchan to Tommy Cavanagh and then to Brian Miller. An ever-present during his first two seasons at the club, he was eventually given the captain's armband. In May 1987, he captained Burnley at the lowest point of their history, when the club almost dropped out of the Football League, and only survived on the last day of the season with a 2–1 victory over Orient at Turf Moor. He played 48 games in the 1987–88 season, and captained the club at Wembley in the 2–0 defeat to Wolverhampton Wanderers in the final of the Football League Trophy. However he featured just 16 times in the 1988–89 season, as he began to become afflicted by injury; during his downtime he began training to be a coach driver. He forced his way back into new manager Frank Casper's first team with 35 appearances in the 1989–90 campaign. He played 50 games as Burnley reached the play-offs in the 1990–91 season, where they were beaten by Torquay United at the semi-final stage. He then announced his retirement from professional football.

Death
In 2008, Deakin was diagnosed with terminal brain cancer and died on Christmas Eve that year, at the age of 49.

Career statistics
Source:

Honours
Burnley
Football League Trophy runner-up: 1988

References

1959 births
2008 deaths
English footballers
Association football fullbacks
Footballers from Liverpool
Everton F.C. players
Port Vale F.C. players
Bolton Wanderers F.C. players
Burnley F.C. players
English Football League players
Deaths from brain cancer in England